The discography of the Japanese entertainer Noriko Sakai consists of 16 studio albums, 16 compilation albums, and 36 singles released since 1987.

Albums

Studio albums

Extended plays

Cover albums

Compilations

Box sets

Singles

International releases

Other recordings

Footnotes

References

External links 
 

Discographies of Japanese artists
Pop music discographies